Minister of Labor and Social Welfare is the person in charge of the Ministry of Labor and Social Welfare of Montenegro (Ministarstvo rada i socijalnog staranja). In 2020, Ministry merged into the Ministry of Finance and Social Welfare. It was re-established in 2022.

Ministers of Labor and Social Welfare, 2006-2020

References

Government ministries of Montenegro
Ministries established in 2006
2006 establishments in Montenegro
Montenegro
Social affairs ministries